Biip.no is a social networking service based in Norway. It is currently offline, with plans to relaunch in December 2020.

Users can use the site to send free SMS messages. As of February 2012, about one million text messages were sent from the site each month.

History
The site was founded on June 1, 2005, by Erling Piken Andersen, Bo Myras and Ozan Özerk.

In 2008, TV 2 and Egmont Group acquired a majority stake for NOK 76 million.

References

External links
 

2005 establishments in Norway
Internet properties established in 2005
Norwegian social networking websites